There are five National Natural Landmarks in Kansas.  

Kansas
National Natural Landmarks